"Fiesta" is a single by R&B female duo Soulhead from the album Naked. The title track is a dance track. The b-sides, meaning and Soulhead is Back (stylized as SOULHEAD is BACK), are R&B inspired.

The single charted at No. 35 on Oricon Weekly.

Information
Fiesta is a song about staying out all night to have fun and dance.

meaning sings about how money isn't everything and that living life in the moment is what life is about.

Soulhead is Back is the theme for the duo with most of the lyrics in English. Only the final rap verse is in Japanese.

The music video for the title track was later put on the CD+DVD version of their Naked album.

Track listing
CD
Fiesta
meaning
Soulhead Is Back

References

2005 singles
2005 songs
Sony Music Entertainment Japan singles